The Baureihe 103 is a class of electric locomotives in Germany, originally operated by Deutsche Bundesbahn. For a long period, they were perceived as flagships of the DB rolling stock.

Development 
In the decades following World War II, the Deutsche Bundesbahn focused on purchasing a large number of standardised electric locomotives. The goal was to promote the electrification program and to replace older types of electric locomotives. With growing economic prosperity, competition with other means of transportation, especially automobiles, was increasing.

Elements of the new class, such as high speed bogies, were tested with existing Class E 10 units.

Prototypes 

Four prototypes were finished in 1965. They were introduced to the public at the Internationale Verkehrsausstellung (international transport fair) in Munich in June 1965 as Class E 03 (Class 103.0 after the introduction of the new numbering system). During exhibition runs to Augsburg they reached 200 km/h on a regular basis. In addition to stronger motors the transformer was also reinforced for serial production.

Serial Type 
The first serial type Class 103.1 was put into service 27. May 1970. With a total number of 145 units Class 103.1 became the backbone of German Trans Europ Express and InterCity lines.

The so-called Automatische Fahr- und Bremssteuerung (AFB) (automatic speed and brake control) automatically kept the train's speed constant at any chosen speed.

Service 
Therefore, Class 103 in the first years did not reach its top speed in regular service. An accident furthermore delayed the introduction of regular top speed services, as on 21 July 1971 the AFB on 103 106 was suspected to be responsible for accelerating the train out of control, resulting in a derailment with 23 dead and 121 injured near Rheinweiler.

In 1979, when second class was introduced in addition to the formerly exclusively first class InterCity system, this resulted in a sharp rise in popularity and demand, making the IC system the backbone for long distance rail travel in West Germany. However, after having only been scheduled for pulling trains with a few first-class carriages or the odd D-train, the major challenge for Class 103 now was to pull heavy  two-class InterCity trains on the long north-south stretches through West Germany. Given the few lines in the network where  were actually reached, their effect on the wear and tear of the locos can therefore be considered a lesser factor.

Until 1987, when the Class 120 three-phase alternating current locomotives were introduced, Class 103 had a near monopoly for fast trains in Germany, and a monopoly for those with operational speeds beyond . By the early 1990s, the intensive utilisation however, had resulted in an increasing number of defects. This tendency was intensified by the fact that DB, striving to be privatized, had significantly cut back on maintenance.

Furthermore, with the first InterCityExpress entering regular service in 1991, Class 103 had been deprived of its role as DB flagship. Considering wear and tear, DB decided to replace these locomotives with the new Class 101, which entered service in 1996. 
In the following years, Class 103 was relegated to lesser duties, but the locomotive had not been designed for frequent stops, so wear increased at an even quicker pace. After a brief comeback in 1998, when all InterCityExpress units were temporarily taken out of service after the Eschede train disaster, the remaining Class 103 units were retired from regular service by 2003. However, on 19 March 2013, these preserved Class 103 locomotives returned to daily services from Munich, wearing their original Inter City livery. Nuremberg-based No. 103245 hauled train IC2201 from Nuremberg HBf with OBB Class 1116 134. Frankfurt based Class 103s are also now scheduled to work IC118 Stuttgart to Munster, IC2099 Frankfurt HBf to Stuttgart, IC 2316 Stuttgart to Wiesbaden and LR78688 Wiesbaden to Frankfurt HBf.

Statistics
 A total of 17 Class 103 have been preserved, with at least five units still operational. Two units are still part of DB rolling stock and are frequently used for test runs.
 On 14.

References

Sources

External links 

 DB 103 @ Trainspo

Electric locomotives of Germany
15 kV AC locomotives
103
Co′Co′ locomotives
AEG locomotives
Brown, Boveri & Cie locomotives
Henschel locomotives
Krauss-Maffei locomotives
Krupp locomotives
Siemens locomotives
Railway locomotives introduced in 1965
Standard gauge locomotives of Germany
Passenger locomotives
Co′Co′ electric locomotives of Europe